Peter Hadley was a politician.

Peter Hadley may also refer to:

Peter Hadley, character in Humboldt County (film) 
Peter Hadley, musician in Love Pump